Arthur Morris Jackson (December 15, 1915 – May 15, 1971) was a Canadian ice hockey player. He played in the National Hockey League with the Toronto Maple Leafs, Boston Bruins, and New York Americans between 1934 and 1945. He won the Stanley Cup twice during his career, in 1941 with Boston, and in 1945 with Toronto. His brother, Harvey "Busher" Jackson also played in the NHL, and was inducted into the Hockey Hall of Fame.

Playing career
A native of Toronto, Ontario, Jackson played junior with the Toronto Marlboros and Toronto St. Michael's Majors. He won the 1934 Memorial Cup, the Canadian junior hockey championship, with St. Michael's. Jackson made his NHL debut in 1934 with the Toronto Maple Leafs, and played for them until 1937. He joined the Boston Bruins for one season before playing 1938–39 with the New York Americans. Jackson returned to Boston in 1939, and spent six seasons there. He spent the final part of the 1944–45 season back with Toronto, and retired, though returned to play two games of senior hockey in 1946–47.

Post-playing career
After retiring from playing hockey Jackson moved to St. Catharines, Ontario, where he became a hockey coach for the OHA and later worked for the Port Weller Dry Docks Ltd. On May 15, 1971, Jackson suffered a heart attack and died while playing golf in the Opening Day Tournament at the St. Catharines Golf Club, at the age of 55.

Career statistics

Regular season and playoffs

See also
 List of family relations in the NHL

External links

1915 births
1971 deaths
Boston Bruins players
Canadian ice hockey centres
New York Americans players
Ice hockey people from Toronto
Stanley Cup champions
Syracuse Stars (AHL) players
Syracuse Stars (IHL) players
Toronto Maple Leafs players
Toronto Marlboros players
Toronto St. Michael's Majors players